Zoboli is an Italian surname. Notable people with the surname include:

Davide Zoboli (born 1981), Italian footballer
Giovanna Zoboli (born 1962), Italian writer
Giovanni Zoboli (born 1821-1884), Italian composer 
Jacopo Zoboli (born 1681–1767), Italian painter
Omar Zoboli (born 1953), Italian professor
Vittorio Zoboli (born 1968), Italian racing driver

Italian-language surnames